Carlos Silva (born April 23, 1979), is a Venezuelan former professional baseball pitcher, who played in Major League Baseball (MLB) for the Philadelphia Phillies (–), Minnesota Twins (–), Seattle Mariners (–), and Chicago Cubs.

Professional career

Philadelphia Phillies
Silva signed with the Philadelphia Phillies as an amateur free agent in 1996. He made his Major League debut in 2002, pitching the entire season out of the bullpen. Silva appeared in 68 games for the Phillies, going 5-0 with a 3.21 ERA and 41 strikeouts. In 2003, he went 3-1 despite an ERA of 4.43 in 62 games and 1 start.

Minnesota Twins
In December 2003, the Twins acquired Silva from Philadelphia along with Nick Punto and Bobby Korecky in exchange for Eric Milton, who had been a staple of the Minnesota rotation since 1998.

With the Twins, Silva made a successful conversion from reliever to starter, in one of the biggest surprises in the 2004 season. He posted a 14–8 mark in 203 innings pitched and finished second in the rotation behind Cy Young winner Johan Santana.  In 2005, he induced more double plays (34) than any other pitcher in the majors.  In 2005, he set the record for fewest walks allowed per 9 innings in the modern era with an average of .43 BB/9 innings.  On May 20, 2005, Silva set a record since 1957 for the fewest pitches thrown (74) in a nine-inning complete game.

In May 2006, Silva was demoted to the bullpen after struggling through the beginning of the season. In June, he re-entered the rotation when the struggling #5 starter, Scott Baker, was demoted to the Twins' Triple-A team in Rochester. He gave up a major-league-worst 1.90 home runs per 9 innings, giving up 38—more than any other major league pitcher, and had a major-league-worst batting average against of .326. In 2006, Silva gave up 38 home runs and allowed only 32 walks. In the previous season, he gave up 25 homers and just 9 walks. These two seasons make up only 15 full all-time seasons in which a pitcher qualifies for the ERA title while giving up more home runs than walks.

Through 2006, Silva posted a 42–32 record with 306 strikeouts and a 4.35 ERA in 743 innings.
In 2007, Silva started as the fifth starter behind Johan Santana, Boof Bonser, Ramón Ortiz, and Sidney Ponson. In his final season with the Twins, Silva finished 13-14 in 33 starts with a career high 89 strikeouts.

Silva allowed Frank Thomas's 500th career home run on June 28, 2007 at the Metrodome.

Seattle Mariners
On December 20, 2007, Silva signed a four-year contract with the Seattle Mariners believed to be somewhere between $44 million and $48 million.

In his first full season as a Mariner, Silva posted the worst ERA for a full-time starter in 2008 with a 6.46 ERA in 28 starts. He also spent time on the DL with a sore elbow. He finished 4-15 as he managed to win just one game after the month of April.

Fresh off the WBC, Silva started the 2009 season slower than expected, with very little control over his pitches, and a high ERA. He sat out most of the season with a shoulder injury. Silva returned at near the end of the season for 2 appearances in relief, giving up one run in 0.2 innings to the Yankees on  September 19 and one run on September 25 in Toronto in one inning.

Chicago Cubs
On December 18, 2009, Silva was traded along with $9 million to the Chicago Cubs for outfielder Milton Bradley. Silva appeared to have turned his career around early in 2010, becoming the first Cubs starter since 1967 to begin a season with an 8–0 record. Despite fighting a stomach virus on June 7, he held the Pittsburgh Pirates to one run over seven innings, picking up his eighth win of the year in a 6–1 triumph. It was the best start by any Cub pitcher since Ken Holtzman began the 1967 season with nine straight wins. However, his success was very limited for the remainder of the season, and he was cut from the Cubs towards the end of spring training in 2011.

New York Yankees

On April 9, 2011, the New York Yankees signed Silva to a minor league deal. He was released on July 2.

Boston Red Sox
On January 3, 2012, Silva signed a minor league deal with the Boston Red Sox. He was released on March 17.

Pitching style
Silva threw a low 90s sinking fastball, a slider, a changeup, and a splitter. He was known for his relatively quick pace, taking very short breaks between pitches.

Personal life
Silva resides in Medina, Minnesota, with his wife Maria Hermann, son Justin, born June 12, 2007, and daughter Gabriella, born September 8, 2008.

See also
 List of Major League Baseball players from Venezuela

Notes

References

External links

Carlos Silva at Pura Pelota (Venezuelan Professional Baseball League)

1979 births
Living people
Batavia Muckdogs players
Beloit Snappers players
Chicago Cubs players
Clearwater Phillies players
Everett AquaSox players
Major League Baseball pitchers
Major League Baseball players from Venezuela
Martinsville Phillies players
Minnesota Twins players
People from Bolívar (state)
Peoria Chiefs players
Philadelphia Phillies players
Piedmont Boll Weevils players
Reading Phillies players
Scranton/Wilkes-Barre Yankees players
Seattle Mariners players
Tacoma Rainiers players
Tampa Yankees players
Trenton Thunder players
Venezuelan expatriate baseball players in the United States
World Baseball Classic players of Venezuela
2006 World Baseball Classic players
2009 World Baseball Classic players